The Rowing and Canoeing course is a rowing and canoeing venue in Lake Zapotlán built at a cost of 30-40 million pesos in Ciudad Guzmán, Jalisco, Mexico.   It was built to host the rowing and canoeing events at the 2011 Pan American Games.  The complex included temporary stands for 1,000 spectators, a return canal, gymnasium and boathouse.   After the games it will serve as a training center and host to national and international competitions.

See also
Rowing at the 2011 Pan American Games
Canoeing at the 2011 Pan American Games

External links
 Profile

References

Venues of the 2011 Pan American Games
Sports venues in Jalisco